"As" is a song written and performed by American singer and musician Stevie Wonder from his 1976 album, Songs in the Key of Life. It reached number 36 on both the Billboard Hot 100 and Black Singles chart. The song gets its name from the first word of its lyrics.

Subject and interpretation
Wonder was injured in a car accident on August 6, 1973, and considered quitting the music industry as a result. He briefly relocated to Ghana in order to help underprivileged children and focus on humanitarian efforts, but eventually made a U-turn on his musical career. During his time in Ghana, Stevie gained a new perspective on life, finding a new love for humanity and the world around him.

The song implies that the love the singer has for their partner will never diminish, as they say that they will love them “always” (the song's main lyric) until the physically impossible becomes true. The impossible feats include: rainbows burning the stars out in the sky, oceans covering the tops of every mountain, dolphins flying, and parrots living at sea, dreaming of life and life becoming a dream, day becoming night and vice versa, trees and the seas flying away, 8×8×8 equaling 4, this day becoming the last day, the Earth turning right to left, the Earth denying itself (for the Sun), Mother Nature saying her work is through, and "until the day that you are me and I am you."

By the most straightforward interpretation of the lyrics, this is a lover serenading his beloved. By another possible interpretation, the song expresses the lyricist's own love for humanity.

Personnel
Nathan Watts – bass, handclaps
Dean Parks – guitar
Herbie Hancock – Fender Rhodes, handclaps
Greg Brown – drums
Stevie Wonder – lead and backing vocal, Fender Rhodes
Mary Lee Whitney – backing vocals
Yolanda Simmons - backing vocals
Dave Hanson, Yolanda Simon, Josette Valentino – handclaps

Charts

George Michael and Mary J. Blige version

In 1999, British singer George Michael and American singer Mary J. Blige covered the song for Michael's greatest hits album Ladies & Gentlemen: The Best of George Michael (1998). Released outside the United States on March 1, 1999, as the second single from the album, "As" became a top-10 hit in Michael's home country, reaching number four on the UK Singles Chart, and also charted within the top 10 in Hungary, Italy, the Netherlands, and Spain.

"As" was not released on the US version of Ladies & Gentlemen or as a single in the US. Michael cited Blige's record company president, Jay Boberg, for pulling the track after Michael's arrest for committing a lewd act in a public restroom. In 2019, Kirk Burrowes, who executive produced Blige's fourth album Mary, told Rated R&B that it was indeed Boberg's decision not to release "As" in the US: "[Boberg] did not want to let George Michael, who initiated that original production, use it as a single in the U.S. to launch his greatest hits album. It pissed everyone off at Sony. It pissed George Michael off. It pissed everyone off, but we couldn't make Jay Boberg bend. He should have put it on the Mary album, but we couldn't put it on the album in the states because he wouldn't let George Michael put it on the Ladies & Gentlemen [album] in the states."

Critical reception
Daily Record commented that Michael "drafted in US soul diva Blige, but the ex-Wham! star is playing safe with his third Stevie Wonder cover."

Music video
A music video was made to accompany the song, directed by Big TV!. It features Michael getting out of a car and entering a club where many doppelgängers of himself and Blige are chilling out and having a drink. Towards the end of the video, most of the people are dancing on the dance floor. It was published on YouTube in December 2010. As of July 2021, the video has been viewed more than 19 million times.

Track listings

 UK CD1 and cassette single
 "As" – 4:42
 "A Different Corner" (live at Parkinson) – 4:28

 UK CD2
 "As" (original) – 4:42
 "As" (Full Crew mix) – 5:37
 "As" (CJ Mackintosh remix) – 6:06

 European CD single
 "As" – 4:42
 "A Different Corner" (live at Parkinson) – 4:28
 "As" (Full Crew mix) – 5:39

 European 12-inch single
A. "As" (original) – 4:42
B. "As" (Full Crew mix) – 5:37

 Australian maxi-CD single
 "As" (original)
 "As" (Full Crew mix)
 "As" (CJ Mackintosh Cosmack R&B mix)
 "As" (CJ Mackintosh Cosmack club mix)
 "As" (video clip)
 "Outside" (video clip)
 "A Different Corner" (live at Parkinson video clip)

Charts

Weekly charts

Year-end charts

Certifications

Other versions
"As" was covered by pianist Gene Harris on his 1977 album Tone Tantrum, with 30 additional seconds.

Sister Sledge covered it and included it on their 1977 album Together. They later performed the song on a 1984 episode of The Jeffersons.

Kimiko Kasai with Herbie Hancock covered it on the 1979 album Butterfly.

"As" was also covered by violinist Jean-Luc Ponty on his 1982 album Mystical Adventures.

Smooth jazz saxophonist/flautist Najee covered the song for his Stevie Wonder tribute album Songs from the Key of Life.

In 2000, singer Nichole Nordeman covered the song on her album This Mystery.

Dutch singer Esmée Denters covered the song for Billboards Mashup Mondays series in 2011.

In 2011 the season 2 winners of vocal competition The Sing-Off, Committed, also covered this song on their self-titled debut album.

Anthony Hamilton and Marsha Ambrosious make cameos in the 2013 film The Best Man Holiday, in which the singers appear as themselves and perform the song as an R&B ballad at a main character's funeral.

The original Stevie Wonder version was featured in The Best Man Holidays predecessor The Best Man in a more lighthearted scene.

In 2014 it was covered by American singer Camille for her Stevie Wonder tribute album I Sing Stevie: The Stevie Wonder Songbook, an album that received an Independent Music Awards nomination for Best Tribute Album.

In 2017 it was covered by American Multi-instrumentalist Bill Wurtz and put on his website under the Jazz page.

Two dance-oriented versions of the song, both with the title "As Always", have reached the UK Singles Chart Top 75: one in 1989 produced by Farley Jackmaster Funk with Ricky Dillard on vocals; another in 1992 by Secret Life.

Singer-songwriter Becca Stevens included a cover of the song, featuring Jacob Collier, on her album Regina (2017).

In 1996 R&B singer Case interpolated the backing vocals for his song "I Gotcha" from his self-titled debut album.

In 2021 a re-mix from the original version of "As" was featured in the In Memoriam moment of the Academy Awards ceremony, credited as "I'll Be Loving You Always".

References

External links
  (Stevie Wonder)
  (George Michael & Mary J. Blige)

1976 songs
1977 singles
1999 singles
Epic Records singles
George Michael songs
Mary J. Blige songs
Motown singles
Music videos directed by Big T.V.
Songs written by Stevie Wonder
Stevie Wonder songs
Tamla Records singles
Male–female vocal duets
Song recordings produced by Stevie Wonder